The Last Time I Did Acid I Went Insane and Other Favorites is the first album by anti-folk artist Jeffrey Lewis.  It was released on CD in 2001 on Rough Trade Records and on vinyl in 2012 on Don Giovanni Records.

Track listing
"The East River"
"Another Girl"
"Seattle"
"The Chelsea Hotel Oral Sex Song"
"Amanda Is a Scalape"
"Heavy Heart"
"The Last Time I Did Acid I Went Insane"
"The Man with the Golden Arm"
"Springtime"
"Life"

References

External links
Jeffrey Lewis live - The man with the golden arm

2001 debut albums
Jeffrey Lewis albums
Don Giovanni Records albums
Rough Trade Records albums